Berkeley George Andrew Moynihan, 1st Baron Moynihan   LL.D  (2 October 1865 – 7 September 1936), known as Sir Berkeley Moynihan, 1st Baronet, from 1922 to 1929, was a noted British abdominal surgeon.

Early years
Moynihan was born in Malta in 1865, the son of Captain Andrew Moynihan, VC.  His father died in 1867 and Moynihan moved with his mother to Leeds, Yorkshire. He was educated in Leeds and the Christ's Hospital, Newgate, London (1875–1881).

Medical career
After two years at the Royal Naval School, Eltham, he returned to Leeds to study medicine at the Leeds School of Medicine. He graduated MB BS at the University of London in 1887 and joined Leeds General Infirmary as house surgeon. He was then successively demonstrator of anatomy in the Medical School (1893–96), assistant surgeon to the infirmary (1896), surgeon from 1906 and consulting surgeon from 1927 until his death.

In parallel with his appointment as surgeon, Moynihan was lecturer in surgery from 1896 to 1909, and from 1910 to 1927 Professor of Clinical Surgery (from 1925 Surgery) at the University of Leeds.

By the end of the Great War Moynihan held the rank of major-general in the British Army and had been chairman of the Army Advisory Board from 1916 and chairman of the council of consultants 1916 to 1919.

He delivered the Bradshaw Lecture in 1920 and the Hunterian oration in 1927. He served as President of the Royal College of Surgeons of England from 1926 to 1932.

In 1935, a year before his death, Moynihan and Dr Killick Millard had founded the British Voluntary Euthanasia Society.

Moynihan's surgery on Park Square, Leeds in the city centre still stands, now used as private offices.  Their former use and connection to Moynihan is marked with a Leeds Civic Society blue plaque.

He would say that the perfect surgeon must have the heart of a lion and the hands of a lady, not the claws of a lion and the heart of a sheep. Or again, " Infinite gentleness, scrupulous care, light handling and purposeful, effective, quiet movements which are no more than a caress, are all necessary if an operation is to be the work of an artist and not merely of a hewer of flesh."  -

Honours
Moynihan was knighted in 1912, appointed a Companion of the Order of the Bath (CB) in 1917, a Knight Commander of the Order of St Michael & St George (KCMG) in 1918 and created a Baronet of Carr Manor in 1922. On 19 March 1929 he was raised to the peerage as Baron Moynihan, of Leeds in the County of York.

There is a lecture theatre/conference space at Thackray Medical Museum, Leeds, named the "Moynihan Auditorium".

Family
Moynihan married Isabella Wellesley Jessop, the daughter of prominent Leeds surgeon Thomas Jessop, on 17 April 1895.  They had three children:

 Hon Dorothy Wellesley Moynihan (born 1897)
 Hon Shelagh Berkeley Moynihan (born 1902), married Henry Wynn Parry, BCh in 1923
 Patrick Berkeley Moynihan, 2nd Baron Moynihan (born 29 July 1906, died 30 April 1965)

Lady Moynihan died on 1 September 1936.  Lord Moynihan died six days later at the age of 70 and was succeeded in the barony and baronetcy by his only son Patrick.

Arms

References

Kidd, Charles, Williamson, David (editors). Debrett's Peerage and Baronetage (1990 edition). New York: St Martin's Press, 1990.

Short biography of Lord Moynihan
Biography of Lord Moynihan

1865 births
1936 deaths
People educated at Christ's Hospital
Alumni of University of London Worldwide
Alumni of the University of London
Barons in the Peerage of the United Kingdom
English surgeons
Fellows of the Royal College of Surgeons
Royal Army Medical Corps officers
British Army generals of World War I
English people of Irish descent
Academics of the University of Leeds
Knights Commander of the Order of St Michael and St George
Companions of the Order of the Bath
19th-century surgeons
19th-century British medical doctors 
20th-century surgeons
20th-century British medical doctors
Leeds Blue Plaques
Barons created by George V